Analog forestry is an approach to ecosystem restoration that considers the process of forest formation and the functioning of forest services to be critical in establishing a sustainable ecosystem characterised by a high biodiversity to biomass ratio. Analogue forestry uses a synthesis of traditional and scientific knowledge to optimize the productive potential of the restoration design rather than maximise the production of one crop, and maximise ecosystem services  by increasing the volumetric mass of the photosynthetic component.

Analogue forestry draws design input not only from traditional models but also from the natural forest successional dynamics. When an ecosystem is designed to be analogous to the indigenous climax state, the efficiency and dynamics of the natural processes can be replicated. These quasi-natural forests are designed to mimic the structural and functional aspects of indigenous forests and are referred to as analog forests. In addition to their ecological characteristics, analog forests are also designed to provide economic benefits. However, it is not until all the ecological requirements of the location are satisfied that economic values of species are considered. Therefore, an analog forest may comprise natural and exotic species in any proportion, the contribution to structure and function being the overriding factor that determines its use.

The theoretical  underpinnings began in 1978 in San Diego and Guatemala. It was first implemented in Sri Lanka around 1981 by Ranil Senanayake as an alternative to monocultures of Pinus and Eucalyptus and has spread to India, Vietnam, Philippines, Australia, Peru, Ecuador, Colombia, Brazil, Costa Rica, Dominican Republic, Honduras, Mexico, Canada, Kenya and Zimbabwe at present.

The International Analog Forestry Network (IAFN) is currently hosted in Costa Rica.

Analog forestry is a system of silviculture that seeks to design, plan and manage ecosystems dominated by woody perennials. It has been primarily employed in tropical or subtropical areas, but can be used in temperate areas too. The design seeks to mimic the architectural structure and ecological function of the preexisting climax vegetation of the area, and can be designed to provide economic, social and environmental benefits.

Analog forestry always considers the inclusion of non-crop native species to be considered in the design and thus addresses the inclusion of native biodiversity in the design. As analog forestry also requires the inclusion of long-lived species of trees in the design it has the capacity to sequester carbon for a longer time than plantation forestry. Analogue forestry has the potential to produce very high values of photosynthetic biomass as its design calls for the inclusion of all the growth forms that occupy the three-dimensional space of the mature indigenous forest. By including many species of crops in one area analog forestry helps spread the risk of market failure on a single crop.

See also

 Forest gardening

References
 Senanayake, R. 1987. Analog Forestry as a Conservation Tool, Tiger Paper, vol XIV no2 PP25–29  FAO, Bangkok

External links
 
 
Both ENDS Analog Forestry Information Package

Sustainable forest management
Sustainable agriculture
Forestry in Sri Lanka